Day of Vengeance is an American Christian hardcore punk and metalcore band from Bradenton, Florida. The band started making music in 2009. Their membership is Josiah Hughes, Steven Spahn, and Richard Tosch. The band released an extended play, Day of Vengeance, in 2011, with Red Cord Records. They released three studio albums, He Who Has Ears, in 2010, Star Breather, in 2012, and, Crutchless, in 2013, all these were with Red Cord Records.

Background
Day of Vengeance is a Christian hardcore and Christian metal band from Bradenton, Florida. Their members are lead vocalist and lead guitarist, Josiah Hughes, bassist, Richard Tosch, and drummer, Steven Spahn.

Music history
The band commenced as a musical entity in June 2009 by founding members Ben Greene and Josiah Hughes, with their first release, He Who Has Ears, a studio album, that was released by Red Cord Records on November 23, 2010. They released, an extended play, Day of Vengeance, on September 30, 2011, with Red Cord Records. The subsequent studio album, Star Breather, was released on June 5, 2012 by Red Cord Records. Their third album, Crutchless, was released on December 3, 2013 by Red Cord Records.

Members
Current members
 Josiah Hughes – vocals, guitar
 Richard Tosch – bass
 Steven Spahn – drums

Past Members
 Ben Greene - vocals
 Phillip Adams - guitar
 Tyler Nelms - drums

Discography
Studio albums
 He Who Has Ears (November 23, 2010, Red Cord Records)
 Star Breather (June 5, 2012, Red Cord Records)
 Crutchless (December 3, 2013, Red Cord Records)
EPs
 Day of Vengeance (September 30, 2011, Red Cord Records)

References

External links
 Facebook page

Musical groups from Florida
2009 establishments in Florida
Musical groups established in 2009